Ask Questions Later is the third album by American noise rock group Cop Shoot Cop, released on March 30, 1993, by Big Cat and Interscope Records.

Track listing

Accolades

Personnel 
Adapted from the Ask Questions Later liner notes.

Cop Shoot Cop
Tod Ashley – lead vocals, high-end bass guitar, guitar (2), cymbal (6), bass drum (6), snare drum (6), whistle (6), sampler (11), percussion (11), mixing (2-8, 10-13)
Jim Coleman – sampler, piano (12), mixing (9)
Jack Natz – low-end bass guitar, lead vocals (8, 10), backing vocals (6, 11), radio (1), snare drum (6)
Phil Puleo – drums, percussion, bass drum (6), snare drum (6)
Additional musicians
April Chung – violin (5)
Jim Colarusso – trumpet (6, 11)
Killjoy – backing vocals (2)
David Ouimet – trombone (6, 11), percussion (11)
Joe Ben Plummer – saxophone (6, 11)

Production and additional personnel
Martin Bisi – production, mixing (2-8, 10-13)
Cop Shoot Cop – production
Cheryl Dawn Dyer – cover art
Roli Mosimann – mixing (1)
Subvert Entertainment – design
Howie Weinberg – mastering

Release history

References

External links 
 

1993 albums
Cop Shoot Cop albums
Big Cat Records albums
Interscope Records albums
Albums produced by Martin Bisi